Rohan Bopanna and Aisam-ul-Haq Qureshi were the defending champions, but decided not to participate.
James Cerretani and Adil Shamasdin won this tournament, by defeating top seeded Scott Lipsky and Rajeev Ram in the final, 6–3, 3–6, [10–7].

Seeds

Draw

Draw

External links
 Main Draw

SA Tennis Open - Doubles
2011 Doubles
2011 in South African tennis